Summary of 2006 IUCN Red List categories.

The Red List Index (RLI), based on the IUCN Red List of Threatened Species, is an indicator of the changing state of global biodiversity.  It defines the conservation status of major species groups, and measures trends in extinction risk over time.  By conducting conservation assessments at regular intervals, changes in the threat status of species in a taxonomic group can be used to monitor trends in extinction risk. RLIs have been calculated for birds and amphibians, using changes in threat status for species in each of the groups.

As well as taxonomic groups, RLIs can show trends in extinction risk according to biogeographic realm, habitat type, and dominant threat process.

Sampled approach
Producing indices of change in extinction risk by comprehensively assessing whole species groups, while feasible for well studied groups with relatively few species, is not suitable for all taxonomic groups. Assessing every species in the larger and lesser known groups which comprise the majority of the world’s biodiversity, such as fungi, invertebrates (particularly insects) and plants, is not practical.

The Red List Index (sampled approach) (SRLI) has been developed in order to determine the threat status and also trends of lesser-known and less charismatic species groups. It is a collaboration between IUCN members and is coordinated through the Institute of Zoology (IoZ), the research division of the Zoological Society of London (ZSL). The SRLI is based on a representative sample of species selected from taxonomic groups within animals (invertebrates and vertebrates), fungi and plants.

Assessment of the selected species will provide baseline information on the current status of biodiversity.  Reassessment at regular intervals will identify changes in threat status over time to provide a more broadly representative picture of biodiversity change.

Applications
The aim is that the SRLI will aid in the production of a global biodiversity indicator capable of measuring whether the rate of biodiversity loss has been reduced. In addition, it will help to develop a better understanding of which taxonomic groups, realms or ecosystems are deteriorating the most rapidly, why species are threatened, where they are threatened, what conservation actions exist and which actions are needed. The aim is to provide policy makers, resource managers, scientists, educators, conservation practitioners and the general public with more thorough knowledge of biodiversity change and further tools with which to make informed decisions.

In April 2002 at the Convention on Biological Diversity (CBD), 188 Nations committed themselves to actions to: “… achieve, by 2010, a significant reduction of the current rate of biodiversity loss at the global, regional and national levels…”   The RLI has been adopted by the CBD as one of the indicators to measure progress towards this important target, and specifically to monitor changes in threat status of species.

See also
IUCN Red List
International Union for the Conservation of Nature and Natural Resources (IUCN)
Convention on Biological Diversity
2010 Biodiversity Indicators Partnership
Millennium Ecosystem Assessment
Institute of Zoology
Zoological Society of London
Living Planet Index
Wild Bird Index
Wildlife Picture Index

References

External links
 IUCN: The IUCN Red List website
 The Red List Index: measuring trends in the extinction risk of species
 Sampled Red List Index for Plants
 Plants at Risk